William T. Davies was a Welsh rugby union and professional rugby league footballer who played in the 1900s and 1910s.

International honours
Will Davies won 4 caps for Wales (RL) in 1909–1912 while at Batley and Halifax, and won a cap for Great Britain (RL) while at Halifax in 1911 against Australia.

References

External links
!Great Britain Statistics at englandrl.co.uk (statistics currently missing due to not having appeared for both Great Britain, and England)

Batley Bulldogs players
Footballers who switched code
Halifax R.L.F.C. players
Great Britain national rugby league team players
Place of birth missing
Place of death missing
Rugby league players from Tredegar
Rugby league wingers
Rugby union players from Tredegar
Tredegar RFC players
Wales national rugby league team players
Welsh rugby league players
Welsh rugby union players
Year of birth missing
Year of death missing